Spodnji Kamenščak is a settlement in the hills southwest of Ljutomer in northeastern Slovenia. The area belongs to the traditional region of Styria and is now included in the Mura Statistical Region.

References

External links
Spodnji Kamenščak on Geopedia

Populated places in the Municipality of Ljutomer